San Nicolás is a municipality located in the Mexican state of Tamaulipas.

External links

Municipalities of Tamaulipas